Leptobarbus rubripinna, also known as the Sultan barb, is a species of freshwater ray-finned fish from the carp and minnow family, Cyprinidae which occurs in south-east Asia.

Taxonomy 
It was until recently considered to be conspecific with Leptobarbus hoevenii but it is now considered to be a separate species, although they share English vernacular names under which both species may appear in the aquarium trade. One of these names, "mad barb", refers to its behavior when apparently intoxicated after consuming some types of poisonous fruit.

Distribution 
It is a common but never abundant species that occurs in Thailand, Cambodia, Laos, and Vietnam in the drainages of the Mekong, Chao Praya and Mae Klong rivers where it is threatened by damming and deforestation, which destroys the seasonally flooded forest this species often feeds in.

Habitat 
It is a migratory species that moves from the deltas and estuaries upstream to spawn, this occurs in January and February in the Mekong with the fish returning downstream in May and June. It feeds on insects and fruits, even poisonous fruits and as a result of this diet its flesh sometimes becomes toxic, although this species is harvested as a food fish.  Adult fish seem to prefer deeper areas in the river such as pools or slow-moving stretches, although they will occur in faster-flowing stretches when feeding.

In cultivation 
As an aquarium fish, it is really only suitable for large public displays and it grows too large for most tanks, reaching sizes of up to 1 meter in length. It is a popular quarry for sport anglers in south-east Asia.

References

Leptobarbus
Fish of Thailand
Fish described in 1937